The Church of St Mary Magdalene, Sutton-in-Ashfield is a parish church in the Church of England in Sutton-in-Ashfield, Nottinghamshire.

The church is Grade II* listed by the Department for Digital, Culture, Media and Sport as it is a particularly significant building of more than local interest.

History

The church is medieval but was rebuilt in 1854 and 1867. It contains a rare 12th century pillar piscina and the remains of the font top from the original Norman church.

By American searches, on 5 July 1607, Edward FitzRandolph was baptised at St. Mary's Church Sutton, marrying Elizabeth Blossom in Scituate, Massachusetts - they are Barack Obama's 10x great-grandparents.

See also
Grade II* listed buildings in Nottinghamshire
Listed buildings in Sutton-in-Ashfield

Sources

Church of England church buildings in Nottinghamshire
Grade II* listed churches in Nottinghamshire
Anglo-Catholic church buildings in Nottinghamshire
Mary